The 2007 Tour of Wellington or 2007 Trust House Classic was held from 24  to 28 January 2007 in New Zealand. It is a multiple stage road cycling race that takes place over seven stages with a total of 499.3 kilometres and is part of the 2006-2007 UCI Oceania Tour.

Men's stage summary

Other leading top threes

Men's top 10 overall

References
 Official website

Tour of Wellington
Cycle races in New Zealand
Tour of Wellington
2007 Tour of Wellington
2007 in Oceanian sport